The 2017–18 Four Hills Tournament, part of the 2017–18 FIS Ski Jumping World Cup, is currently taking place at the four traditional venues of Oberstdorf, Garmisch-Partenkirchen, Innsbruck and Bischofshofen, located in Germany and Austria, between 30 December 2017 and 6 January 2018.

Kamil Stoch successfully defended his title, becoming the first ski jumper since Gregor Schlierenzauer in 2012–13 to do so. By winning all four events, Stoch became the second ski jumper in history to achieve this feat, Sven Hannawald being the first in 2001–02.

Results

Oberstdorf
 HS 137 Schattenbergschanze, Germany
30 December 2017

Garmisch-Partenkirchen
 HS 140 Große Olympiaschanze, Germany
1 January 2018

Innsbruck
 HS 130 Bergiselschanze, Austria
 4 January 2018

Bischofshofen
 HS 140 Paul-Ausserleitner-Schanze, Austria
 6 January 2018

Overall standings
The final standings after all four events:

References

External links 
 

2017-18
2017 in ski jumping
2018 in ski jumping
2017 in German sport
2018 in German sport
2018 in Austrian sport